The pont Saint-Louis is a pedestrian bridge across the River Seine in the 4th arrondissement of Paris.  It links the Île de la Cité with the Île Saint-Louis.  It is served by the Cité stop of the Paris Metro

History 

The present bridge is the seventh to link the two islands since 1630.  The pont Saint-Landry (1630–1634) was the first of  these.

In 1717 a wooden bridge was rebuilt, with seven arches, and named the "Pont Rouge", due to the colour in which it was painted. It was destroyed in 1795. In 1804, under the direction of the engineer Dumoustier, a new two-arch bridge was built, 70 m long and 10 m wide, and mainly in oak. It was demolished in 1811, and a suspension bridge replaced it in 1842. Twenty years later, this was replaced by a metallic bridge, with a single arch with a 64m opening. In 1939, this one was demolished.  In 1941, it was replaced by a passerelle resembling an iron cage. In 1968, the present bridge was begun, and inaugurated in 1970.

External links 

  Mairie de Paris
  Structurae

Saint-Louis
Saint-Louis
Saint-Louis
Buildings and structures in the 4th arrondissement of Paris